The State-Mafia Pact (original title: La trattativa) is a 2014 Italian documentary film written and directed by Sabina Guzzanti, who also starred in the film. The storyline is about the State-Mafia Pact, the negotiation between Italian State and Cosa Nostra, that is supposed to be occurred after the '92-'93 bombings. It was screened out of competition at the 71st Venice International Film Festival.

Cast 
 Sabina Guzzanti
 Enzo Lombardo
 Ninni Bruschetta
 Filippo Luna
 Franz Cantalupo
 Claudio Castrogiovanni

See also
È Stato la mafia
State-Mafia Pact

References

External links 
 
 

2014 films
2010s Italian-language films
Italian satirical films
2010s mockumentary films
Films directed by Sabina Guzzanti
Films scored by Nicola Piovani
2010s Italian films